Scholarius (Σχολάριος), Scholares (Σχολάρης) or Scholaris  may be:
Greek scholars in the Renaissance
the title of a medieval scholar in general
a member of the Scholae Palatinae military unit
the epithet of Gennadius Scholarius
the epithet of Niketas Scholares